Tomaž Jemc (born 2 March 1964 in Bled) is a Slovenian former alpine skier who competed for Yugoslavia in the 1984 Winter Olympics, where he finished 30th in the Men's downhill.

External links
 sports-reference.com
 

1964 births
Living people
Slovenian male alpine skiers
Olympic alpine skiers of Yugoslavia
Alpine skiers at the 1984 Winter Olympics
People from Bled
20th-century Slovenian people